Bragat is a Torricelli language of Papua New Guinea. It is spoken in four villages, including in Yauan village, Sundun ward, Palmai Rural LLG, Sandaun Province.

References

Torricelli Range languages
Languages of Sandaun Province